Zhili Township is a township-level division of Xingtang County, Shijiazhuang, Hebei, China. The principal town is Zhilixiang and lies southeast of Xingtang Town, about a quarter of the way along the road from there to Xinle in the southeast. The township has an area of 60.79 square kilometres.

See also
List of township-level divisions of Hebei

References

Township-level divisions of Hebei